Charles Fisher was an English professional football wing half who played in the Football League for Brentford.

Career statistics

References

1899 births
English footballers
English Football League players
Brentford F.C. players
1985 deaths
Aston Villa F.C. players
Footballers from Birmingham, West Midlands
Margate F.C. players
Kidderminster Harriers F.C. players
Association football midfielders
Footballers from Handsworth, West Midlands
England youth international footballers